Dawn Explosion, the third and most recent album by Captain Beyond, was released in 1977. While the band had broken up four years before, Warner Bros. Records signed a deal with the band's original label, Capricorn Records, and contacted the band members asking them to reunite. Original member Bobby Caldwell returned on drums, but original lead vocalist Rod Evans could not be contacted after extensive enquiries: Captain Beyond held auditions, and selected Willy Daffern to replace him. 

The track "Dawn Explosion" was recorded during the album sessions, but was cut from the final album, despite taking its title from it.

Track listing

CD reissues split "Breath of Fire, Part 1 & Part 2" into two tracks (subtitled "A Speck Within a Sphere" and "Alone in the Cosmos", respectively), and "Oblivion" into three tracks (with the preceding "Space Interlude" and succeeding "Space Reprise" being the sound effects and percussion that bookend the main section of "Oblivion").

Personnel
Captain Beyond
 Willy Daffern – lead vocals
 Larry "Rhino" Reinhardt – lead guitar, acoustic guitar, slide guitar
 Lee Dorman – bass, backing vocals, string ensemble synthesizer
 Bobby Caldwell – drums, percussion,  backing vocals

Charts

References

Captain Beyond albums
1977 albums
Warner Records albums